Karapınar Solar Power Plant is a photovoltaic power station in Konya Province, central Turkey.

Built in the Renewable Energy Resource Area (YEKA) in Karapınar district in Konya Province, the plant will have 1,300 MW installed power when fully completed. With this capacity, it will be the largest single source of solar power in Turkey. The project includes a factory annually producing 500 MWp photovoltaic solar modules and a R&D Center.

The tender for the construction was won on 20 March 2017 by a consortium of the Turkish Kalyon Group and South Korea's Hanwha, which offered the lowest kW·h-price with 6.99 US cent valid for an energy purchase term of 15 years. The amount of the investment is expected to exceed US$1.3 billion. It is planned that more than 1,500 people will be employed in the project. First panels became operational in September 2020, and the 3.5 million panel plant is expected to be completed by May or June 2023. When fully completed, the solar power station will generate 1,700 GWh annually, sufficient to supply 600,000 households. As of April 2022 installed capacity of the plant is 700 MW.

References

Photovoltaic power stations in Turkey
2020 establishments in Turkey
Buildings and structures in Konya Province
Karapınar District